Oak Creek is a tributary stream of the Owens River, in Inyo County, California.
Its mouth lies at an elevation of 3,924 feet / 1,196 meters, 2.2 miles north northwest of Independence, California, just south of the Fort Independence Reservation.

References 

Rivers of Inyo County, California
Tributaries of the Owens River
Rivers of the Sierra Nevada (United States)
Inyo National Forest
Owens Valley
Rivers of Northern California
Rivers of the Sierra Nevada in California